Transportation Research Part E: Logistics and Transportation Review is a bimonthly peer-reviewed academic journal which publishes information and articles about logistics and transportation research. It was established in 1997 and is published by Elsevier. The editors-in-chief are Tsan-Ming Choi (Hong Kong Polytechnic University) and Qiang Meng (National University of Singapore). It is ranked as a top journal in the Australian ABDC business school journal list (A*) and FMS Journal Rating Guide 2020. According to the Journal Citation Reports, the journal has a 2021 impact factor of 10.047.

See also

Transportation Research Part A: Policy and Practice
Transportation Research Part D: Transport and Environment

References

External links

Transportation journals
Elsevier academic journals
English-language journals
Bimonthly journals
Publications established in 1996